The Stavoren Lighthouse is a lighthouse near Stavoren on the IJsselmeer, in the Netherlands. On two nearby piers are a red and a green light beacon for the Stavoren harbor. All were built in 1885 (probably by Quirinus Harder) and are Rijksmonuments since 1999. The lighthouse was restored in 2001.

See also

 List of lighthouses in the Netherlands

References

External links
 Artikel op vuurtorens.net

Lighthouses completed in 1885
Lighthouses in Friesland
Rijksmonuments in Friesland
Súdwest-Fryslân